Arielle is a feminine given name and an alternative spelling of the name Ariel. Notable people with the name include:

 Arielle Charnas, American blogger
 Arielle Dombasle (born 1958) French-American actress
 Arielle Free (born 1988), Scottish DJ and TV & radio presenter
 Arielle Gold (born 1996), American Olympic bronze medalist and World Champion snowboarder
 Arielle Greenberg (born 1972), American poet
 Arielle Holmes (born 1993), American actress
 Arielle Jacobs, American actress
 Arielle Kebbel (born 1985), American film and television actress
 Arielle Martin (born 1985), American BMX cyclist
 Ariel Nicholson, American fashion model
 Arielle Nobile (born 1979), American film director and producer 
 Arielle North Olson (born 1932), American author of children's books
 Arielle Ship (born 1995), American soccer player
 Arielle Tepper (born 1972), American theater producer
 Arielle Vandenberg (born 1986), American actress
 Arielle Vernède (born 1953), Dutch pianist

See also
 Arielle (disambiguation)
 Ariel (given name)

Feminine given names